Myotinae is a subfamily of vesper bats. It contains three genera: Eudiscopus, Myotis, and Submyotodon. Before the description of Submyotodon and analysis of its phylogenetics, as well as a phylogenetic analysis of Eudiscopus, the only member of Myotinae was Myotis.

Species
Eudiscopus
 Eudiscopus denticulus (Osgood, 1932) - disk-footed bat
Myotis
Myotis adversus (Horsfield, 1824) - large-footed bat, large-footed mouse-eared bat, large-footed myotis
 Myotis aelleni (Baud, 1979) - southern myotis
 Myotis albescens (E. Geoffroy, 1806) - silver-tipped myotis
 Myotis alcathoe (von Helversen and  Heller, 2001) - Alcathoe bat
 Myotis altarium (Thomas, 1911) - Szechwan myotis
 Myotis alticranius Osgood, 1932 - Indochinese whiskered myotis
 Myotis ancricola Kruskop, Borisenko, Dudorova, & Artyushin, 2018 - valley myotis
 Myotis anjouanensis (Dorst, 1960) - Anjouan myotis
 Myotis annamiticus (Kruskop and Tsytsulina, 2001) - Annamit myotis
 Myotis annatessae Kruskop & Borisenko, 2013 - Anna Tess's myotis
 Myotis annectans (Dobson, 1871) - hairy-faced bat
 Myotis armiensis Carrión-Bonilla & Cook, 2020 - Armién's myotis
 Myotis atacamensis (Lataste, 1892) - Atacama myotis
 Myotis ater (Peters, 1866) - Peters's myotis, small black myotis
 Myotis attenboroughi Moratelli et al., 2017 - Sir David Attenborough's myotis
 Myotis aurascens (Kuzyakin, 1935)
 Myotis auriculus (Baker and  Stains, 1955) - southwestern myotis
 Myotis australis (Dobson, 1878) - Australian myotis
 Myotis austroriparius (Rhoads, 1897) - southeastern myotis
 Myotis badius Tiunov, Kruskop, & Feng Jiang, 2011 - chestnut myotis
 Myotis bakeri Moratelli, Novaes, Bonilla, & D. E. Wilson, 2019 - Baker's myotis
 Myotis bartelsii (Jentink, 1910) - Bartels's myotis
 Myotis bechsteinii (Kuhl, 1817) - Bechstein's bat
 Myotis blythii (Tomes, 1857) - lesser mouse-eared bat
 Myotis bocagii (Peters, 1870) - rufous mouse-eared bat
 Myotis bombinus (Thomas, 1906) - Far Eastern myotis, bombinus bat
 Myotis borneoensis Hill & Francis, 1984 - Bornean whiskered myotis
 Myotis brandtii (Eversmann, 1845) - Brandt's bat
 Myotis browni E. H. Taylor, 1934 - Brown's whiskered myotis
 Myotis bucharensis (Kuzyakin, 1950) - Bocharic myotis, Bokhara whiskered bat
 Myotis californicus (Audubon and  Bachman, 1842) - California myotis
 Myotis capaccinii (Bonaparte, 1837) - long-fingered bat
 Myotis caucensis Allen, 1914 - Colombian black myotis
 Myotis chiloensis (Waterhouse, 1840) - Chilean myotis
 Myotis chinensis (Tomes, 1857) - large myotis
 Myotis ciliolabrum (Merriam, 1886) - western small-footed bat, western small-footed myotis
 Myotis clydejonesi Moratelli, D. E. Wilson, A. L. Gardner, Fisher, & Gutierrez, 2016 - Clyde Jones's myotis
 Myotis cobanensis (Goodwin, 1955) - Guatemalan myotis
 Myotis crypticus Ruedi, Ibáñez, Salicini, Juste & Puechmaille, 2019 - cryptic myotis
 Myotis csorbai (Topál, 1997) - Csorba's mouse-eared bat
 Myotis dasycneme (Boie, 1825) - pond bat
 Myotis daubentonii (Kuhl, 1817) - Daubenton's bat
 Myotis davidii (Peters, 1869) - David's myotis
 Myotis dieteri (Happold, 2005) - Kock's mouse-eared bat
 Myotis diminutus Moratelli & Wilson, 2011 - diminutive myotis
 Myotis dinellii Thomas, 1902 - Dinelli's myotis
 Myotis dominicensis Miller, 1902 - Dominican myotis
 Myotis elegans Hall, 1962 - elegant myotis
 Myotis emarginatus (E. Geoffroy, 1806) - Geoffroy's bat
 Myotis escalerai Cabrera, 1904 - Escalera's bat
 Myotis evotis (H. Allen, 1864) - long-eared myotis
 Myotis federatus Thomas, 1916 - Malaysian whiskered myotis
 Myotis fimbriatus (Peters, 1871) - fringed long-footed myotis
 Myotis findleyi Bogan, 1978 - Findley's myotis
 Myotis formosus (Hodgson, 1835) - Hodgson's bat, copper-winged bat
 Myotis fortidens Miller and  Allen, 1928 - cinnamon myotis
 Myotis frater G.M. Allen, 1923 - fraternal myotis
 Myotis gomantongensis Francis and  Hill, 1998 - Gomantong myotis
 Myotis goudotii (A. Smith, 1834) - Malagasy mouse-eared bat
 Myotis gracilis Ognev, 1927
 Myotis grisescens A.H. Howell, 1909 - gray bat
 Myotis hajastanicus Argyropulo, 1939 - Armenian whiskered bat, Hajastan myotis, Armenian myotis
 Myotis handleyi Moratelli, A. L. Gardner, J. A. Oliveira, & D. E. Wilson, 2013 - Handley's myotis
 Myotis hasseltii (Temminck, 1840) - lesser large-footed bat
 Myotis hermani Thomas, 1923 - Herman's myotis
 Myotis horsfieldii (Temminck, 1840) - Horsfield's bat
 Myotis hoveli Harrison, 1964 - Hovel's myotis
 Myotis hyrcanicus Benda et al., 2012 - Hyrcanian myotis
 Myotis ikonnikovi Ognev, 1912 - Ikonnikov's bat
 Myotis indochinensis Son et al., 2013 - Indochinese myotis
 Myotis insularum (Dobson, 1878) - insular myotis
 Myotis izecksohni Moratelli, Peracchi, Dias & de Oliveira, 2011 - Izecksohn's myotis
 Myotis keaysi J.A. Allen, 1914 - hairy-legged myotis
 Myotis keenii (Merriam, 1895) -  Keen's myotis
 Myotis laniger Peters, 1871 - Chinese water myotis
 Myotis larensis LaVal, 1973 - Lara myotis
 Myotis lavali Moratelli, Peracchi, Dias, & Oliveira, 2011 - LaVal's Myotis
 Myotis leibii (Audubon and  Bachman, 1842) - eastern small-footed bat
 Myotis levis (I. Geoffroy, 1824) - yellowish myotis
 Myotis longicaudatus Ognev, 1927 - long-tailed myotis
 Myotis longipes (Dobson, 1873) - Kashmir cave bat
 Myotis lucifugus (Le Conte, 1831) - little brown bat, eastern little brown myotis
 Myotis macrodactylus (Temminck, 1840) - eastern long-fingered bat, big-footed myotis
 Myotis macropus (Gould, 1854) - southern myotis, large-footed myotis
 Myotis macrotarsus (Waterhouse, 1845) - pallid large-footed myotis, Philippine large-footed myotis
 Myotis martiniquensis LaVal, 1973 - Schwartz's myotis
 Myotis melanorhinus Merriam, 1890 - dark-nosed small-footed myotis
 Myotis midastactus Moratelli & Wilson, 2014 - golden myotis
 Myotis moluccarum (Thomas, 1915) - Maluku myotis, Arafura large-footed bat
 Myotis montivagus (Dobson, 1874) - Burmese whiskered bat
 Myotis morrisi Hill, 1971 - Morris's bat
 Myotis muricola (Gray, 1846) - wall-roosting mouse-eared bat, Nepalese whiskered myotis
 Myotis myotis (Borkhausen, 1797) - greater mouse-eared bat
 Myotis mystacinus (Kuhl, 1817) - whiskered bat
 Myotis nattereri (Kuhl, 1817) - Natterer's bat
 Myotis nesopolus Miller, 1900 - Curacao myotis
 Myotis nigricans (Schinz, 1821) - black myotis
 Myotis nimbaensis (Simmons et al., 2021) - Nimba mountain bat
 Myotis nipalensis Dobson, 1871 - Nepal myotis
 Myotis nyctor LaVal & Schwartz, 1974 - Barbados myotis
 Myotis occultus Hollister, 1909 - Arizona myotis
 Myotis oreias (Temminck, 1840) - Singapore whiskered bat
 Myotis oxyotus (Peters, 1867) - montane myotis
 Myotis peninsularis Miller, 1898 - peninsular myotis
 Myotis pequinius Thomas, 1908 - Beijing mouse-eared bat, Peking myotis
 Myotis petax Hollister, 1912 - eastern water bat, Sakhalin bat
 Myotis peytoni Wroughton & Ryley, 1913 - Peyton's myotis
 Myotis phanluongi Borisenko, Kruskop and  Ivanova, 2008 - Phan Luong's myotis
 Myotis pilosatibialis LaVal, 1973 - northern hairy-legged myotis
 Myotis pilosus Peters, 1869 - Rickett's big-footed bat
 Myotis planiceps Baker, 1955 - flat-headed myotis
 Myotis pruinosus Yoshiyuki, 1971 - frosted myotis
 Myotis punicus Felten, Spitzenberger and Storch, 1977 - Felten's myotis
 Myotis ricketti (Thomas, 1894)
 Myotis ridleyi Thomas, 1898 - Ridley's bat
 Myotis riparius Handley, 1960 - riparian myotis
 Myotis rosseti (Oey, 1951) - thick-thumbed myotis
 Myotis ruber (E. Geoffroy, 1806) - red myotis
 Myotis rufoniger (Tomes, 1858) - reddish-black myotis
 Myotis rufopictus (Waterhouse, 1845) - orange-fingered myotis
 Myotis schaubi Kormos, 1934 - Schaub's myotis
 Myotis scotti Thomas, 1927 - Scott's mouse-eared bat
 Myotis secundus Ruedi, Csorba, Lin, & Chou , 2015 - long-toed myotis
 Myotis septentrionalis (Trouessart, 1897) - northern long-eared bat, northern myotis
 Myotis sibiricus (Kastschenko, 1905) - Siberian whiskered myotis
 Myotis sicarius Thomas, 1915 - Mandelli's mouse-eared bat
 Myotis siligorensis (Horsfield, 1855) - Himalayan whiskered bat
 Myotis simus Thomas, 1901 - velvety myotis
 Myotis sodalis Miller and  Allen, 1928 - Indiana bat
 Myotis soror Ruedi, Csorba, Lin, & Chou, 2015 - reddish myotis
 Myotis sowerbyi Howell, 1926 - Sowerby's whiskered myotis
 Myotis stalkeri Thomas, 1910 - Kei myotis
 Myotis thysanodes Miller, 1897 - fringed myotis
 Myotis tricolor (Temminck, 1832) - Cape hairy bat, little brown bat, Temminck's mouse-eared bat, Cape myotis, tricoloured mouse-eared bat, Cape hairy myotis, Temminck's hairy bat, three-coloured bat
 Myotis tschuliensis Kuzyakin, 1935 - Tschuli myotis
 Myotis velifer (J.A. Allen, 1890) - cave myotis
 Myotis vivesi Menegaux, 1901 - fish-eating bat, fish-eating myotis
 Myotis volans (H. Allen, 1866) - long-legged myotis
 Myotis weberi (Jentink, 1890) - Weber's myotis
 Myotis welwitschii (Gray, 1866) - Welwitsch's bat, Welwitsch's mouse-eared bat, Welwitsch's myotis
 Myotis yanbarensis Maeda and  Matsumara, 1998 - Yanbaru whiskered bat
 Myotis yumanensis (H. Allen, 1864) - Yuma myotis
 Myotis zenatius  Ibáñez, Juste, Salicini, Puechmaille & Ruedi, 2019 - Zenati myotis
Submyotodon
 Submyotodon caliginosus (Tomes, 1859) - Himalayan broad-muzzled bat
 Submyotodon latirostris (Kishida, 1932) - Taiwan broad-muzzled bat
 Submyotodon moupinensis (Milne-Edwards, 1872) - Moupin broad-muzzled bat

Notes

References

Mammal subfamilies
Taxa named by George Henry Hamilton Tate
Vesper bats